The 2005–06 Polish Cup was the fifty-second season of the annual Polish cup competition. It began on 2 August 2005 with the Preliminary Round and ended on 3 May 2006 with second leg of the Final, played at Stadion im. Kazimierza Górskiego, Płock. The winners qualified for the first qualifying round of the UEFA Cup.

Preliminary round 
The matches took place on 15 August 2005.

! colspan="3" style="background:cornsilk;"|15 August 2005

|}

Notes
Note 1: Sława Sławno withdrew from the competition.
Note 2: Promień Żary withdrew from the competition.

Round 1 
The matches took place on 9, 10 and 30 August 2005.

! colspan="3" style="background:cornsilk;"|9 August 2005

|-
! colspan="3" style="background:cornsilk;"|10 August 2005

|-
! colspan="3" style="background:cornsilk;"|30 August 2005

|}

Notes
Note 1: RKS Radomsko withdrew from the competition.

Round 2 
The first legs took place between 20 and 27 September, when the second legs took place on 25 and 26 October 2005.

|}

Round 3 
The first legs took place between 8 and 11 November, when the second legs took place between 15 and 30 November 2005.

|}

Quarter-finals 
The first legs took place between 22 November and 13 December, when the second legs took place between 29 November 2005 and 7 March 2006.

|}

Semi-finals 
The first legs took place on 14 and 15 April, when the second legs took place on 21 and 22 April 2006.

|}

Final

First leg

Second leg 

Wisła Płock won 6–3 on aggregate.

References

External links 
 90minut.pl 

Polish Cup seasons
Polish Cup
Cup